HMS Clarence was a 74-gun third rate ship of the line of the Royal Navy, launched on 11 April 1812 at Turnchapel.

In 1826 Clarence was re-rated as a fourth rate. She was broken up in 1828.

Notes

Citations

References

Lavery, Brian (2003) The Ship of the Line - Volume 1: The development of the battlefleet 1650-1850. Conway Maritime Press. .

Ships of the line of the Royal Navy
Vengeur-class ships of the line
Ships built in Devon
1812 ships